Sizemore is a family name that may refer to:
 Barbara Sizemore (1927–2004), educator, researcher from Chicago, headed Washington, DC schools
 Bill Sizemore (born 1951), political activist in Clackamas, Oregon
 Chris Costner Sizemore (1927–2016), patient with multiple personality disorder
 Grady Sizemore III (born 1982), professional baseball player for the Philadelphia Phillies
 Herschel Sizemore (born 1935), American mandolinist
 James Sizemore (born 1978), composer and orchestrator of film scores
 James Sizemore, American director of The Demon's Rook
 Jason Sizemore, American writer and editor
 Scott Sizemore (born 1985), professional baseball player, last played for the New York Yankees
 Susan Sizemore (1951–2020), American novelist
 Ted Sizemore (born 1945), former professional baseball player
 Tom Sizemore (1961–2023), American actor

Surnames